Copelatus bombycinus is a species of diving beetle. It is part of the genus Copelatus in the subfamily Copelatinae of the family Dytiscidae. It was described by Guignot in 1952.

References

bombycinus
Beetles described in 1952